Río Chico is a city in Miranda State, Venezuela. It is the capital of Páez Municipality.

External links
Google Satellite Maps
Río Chico celebra 222 años de fundada (Spanish)
Venezuela Tuya (Spanish)

Cities in Miranda (state)